Paul-Emile Saadé (9 July 1933 – 21 September 2022) was Lebanese Maronite Catholic prelate who was Emeritus Maronite Eparch of the Maronite Catholic Eparchy of Batroun.

Life
Paul-Emile Saadé was born in Ehden, Mount Lebanon on 9 July 1933.

Saadé received his priestly ordination on 12 April 1958. On 2 May 1986, Pope John Paul II appointed him titular bishop of Apamea in Syria dei Maroniti and auxiliary bishop of Antioch. Maronite Patriarch of Antioch, Nasrallah Boutros Sfeir ordained him bishop on 12 July of the same year. His co-consecrators were Roland Aboujaoudé, Auxiliary bishop of Antioch, Georges Abi-Saber, Auxiliary bishop of Antioch, Chucrallah Harb, Eparch of Jounieh, Joseph Mohsen Béchara, Archeparch of Cyprus, Khalil Abi-Nader, Archeparch of Beirut, Ignace Ziadé, Emeritus Archeparch of Beirut, Antoine Joubeir, Archeparch of Tripoli, Elie Farah, Emeritus Archeparch of Cyprus, Joseph Merhi, Eparch of Cairo and Ibrahim Hélou, Eparch of Sidon.
 
On 5 June 1999, Saadé was appointed bishop of the Maronite Eparchy of Batroun. On 5 June 2011, his resignation by reason of age was accepted by Pope Benedict XVI.

Saadé died on 21 September 2022, at the age of 89.

References

External links

 http://www.gcatholic.org/dioceses/diocese/batr0.htm
Bishop Paul Emil Saade on Ehden Family Tree Website

1933 births
2022 deaths
21st-century Maronite Catholic bishops
Lebanese clergy
People from Zgharta